The 1967 Miami Dolphins season was the team's second in the American Football League (AFL). The Dolphins improved by 1 game over their 3–11 inaugural season from 1966, finishing 4–10 and in 4th place in the AFL Eastern Division. The team began its season with two straight bye weeks. In the first game, they beat Denver, 35–21, to win their first ever season opener. However, the Dolphins then lost 8 straight games before beating the Buffalo Bills, 17–14, at home. The Dolphins went winless on the road this season. However, the Dolphins scored 40 points in back-to-back games, with 41-24 and 41-32 wins over the Chargers and Patriots, respectively.

Offseason

Common draft

Personnel

Staff

Roster

Regular season

Schedule

Game summaries

Week 14

Standings

References

External links
 1967 Miami Dolphins at Pro-Football-Reference.com

Miami Dolphins seasons
Miami Dolphins
Miami Dolphins